Sofia Black-D'Elia (born December 24, 1991) is an American actress. She is known for her television roles, such as Tea Marvelli in Skins, Sage Spence in Gossip Girl, Andrea Cornish in The Night Of, and Frannie Latimer in  Your Honor. From 2017 to 2018 Black-D'Elia starred as Sabrina on the Fox comedy The Mick. She also starred in the 2015 film Project Almanac and the 2016 film Viral. Currently, Black-D'Elia plays the lead role in the Freeform comedy series Single Drunk Female, which premiered on January 20, 2022.

Early life 
Black-D'Elia was born and raised in Clifton, New Jersey, where she graduated from Clifton High School. Her mother, Elinor, works in printing. Her father, Anthony V. D'Elia, is a judge of the Superior Court of New Jersey. Her father is of Italian descent and her mother is Jewish. Black-D'Elia had a bat mitzvah ceremony. She started acting at the age of five and signed up for dancing classes at Broadway Bound.

Career 
When she was seventeen, Black-D'Elia was cast in her first significant role on the soap opera All My Children as the recurring character Bailey. In 2010, she was cast the role of Tea on the MTV teen drama Skins, where she played an openly lesbian teenager. Starting in the fall of 2012, Black-D'Elia played Sage Spence in the sixth and final season of Gossip Girl. She also portrayed Jessie in the Michael Bay-produced time travel thriller Project Almanac, which was released in January 2015. In 2016, she appeared in the HBO miniseries The Night Of. The same year she starred as Emma in the horror film Viral.

Black-D'Elia played the role of Sabrina Pemberton on Fox comedy television comedy series The Mick from 2017 to 2018. In 2019 she was in the role of Frannie on the Showtime legal drama television series Your Honor, which premiered in late 2020.  She currently stars as the lead in the Freeform comedy series Single Drunk Female which premiered in January 2022. In April 2022, the series was renewed for a second season.

Personal life 
Black-D'Elia lives in New York City. Black-D'Elia met filmmaker Henry Joost while working on the 2016 film Viral, which he co-directed. They got married in October 2021.

Filmography

References

External links
 

Living people
American people of Italian descent
American child actresses
American film actresses
American television actresses
Jewish American actresses
Clifton High School (New Jersey) alumni
People from Clifton, New Jersey
Actresses from New Jersey
21st-century American Jews
21st-century American women
1991 births